Breit is a municipality in Rhineland-Palatinate, Germany

Breit may also refer to:

Persons with the surname Breit 
 Franz Breit (1817–1868), Obstetrician
 Gary Breit, Canadian musician
 Kevin Breit, Canadian musician
 Gregory Breit (1899–1981), American physicist
 Henryk Breit (1906–1941), Polish philologist and journalist
 William L. Breit (1933–2011), American economist

Topics in physics 
 Breit equation
 Relativistic Breit–Wigner distribution
 Breit-Rabi Oscillation (or Breit-Rabi cycle)
 Breit-Rabi formula

Music 
 "Breit", A song by German band Die Ärzte from Jazz ist anders

Business 
 BREIT, a large real estate investment trust managed by Blackstone